Pine is an unincorporated community and a U.S. Post Office in Jefferson County, Colorado, United States.  The Pine Post Office has the ZIP Code 80470.

The town is also called Pine Grove. Every summer the residents hold the annual Rhubarb Festival.

Geography
Pine is located at  (39.409937,-105.321980).

References

Unincorporated communities in Jefferson County, Colorado
Unincorporated communities in Colorado
Denver metropolitan area